This is a list of commanders of the Brazilian Navy.

With the creation of the Ministry of Defence, on 10 June 1999, by complementary law No. 97 of 9 June 1999, the Ministry of the Navy was transformed into Navy Command, and the Minister of the Navy came to be called Commander of the Navy.

United Kingdom of Portugal, Brazil and the Algarves

Reference: Brazilian Navy

Empire of Brazil

Reign of Pedro I

Regency period

Reign of Pedro II

Republican period

First Brazilian Republic

Vargas Era (Second and Third Brazilian Republics)

Fourth Brazilian Republic

Military dictatorship (Fifth Brazilian Republic)

Sixth Brazilian Republic

References 

Brazilian admirals
Navy